Wang Yunlu (born 20 May 1996 in Beijing) is a Chinese volleyball player. She won the 2013 FIVB Volleyball Girls' U18 World Championship.

She was part of the China team in 2017 who took part in the FIVB Volleyball World Grand Prix in Macao. The team who included Zhu Ting, Qian Jingwen, Zheng Yixin, Wang Mengjie played against the US, Turkey and Italy. The final part of the competition was in Nanjing in China where the team came fourth.

Clubs
  Army

References

1996 births
Living people
Chinese women's volleyball players
Volleyball players from Beijing
Wing spikers
21st-century Chinese women